The 2017 Sporting Kansas City season was the twenty-second season of the team's existence in Major League Soccer and the seventh year played under the Sporting Kansas City moniker.

Current roster

Player Movement

In 
Per Major League Soccer and club policies terms of the deals do not get disclosed.

Out

Loans 
Per Major League Soccer and club policies terms of the deals do not get disclosed.

In

Competitions

Match results

Preseason
Kickoff times are in CST (UTC-06) unless shown otherwise

Desert Diamond Cup

Regular season

Kickoff times are in CDT (UTC-05) unless shown otherwise

MLS Cup Playoffs

Kickoff times are in CDT (UTC-05) unless shown otherwise

U.S. Open Cup

Kickoff times are in CDT (UTC-05) unless shown otherwise

Player statistics

Top scorers

As of October 26, 2017

Disciplinary record

As of October 26, 2017.

References

Sporting Kansas City seasons
Sporting Kansas City
2017 Major League Soccer season
Sporting Kansas City
2017